In meteorology, an okta is a unit of measurement used to describe the amount of cloud cover at any given location such as a weather station. Sky conditions are estimated in terms of how many eighths of the sky are covered in cloud, ranging from 0 oktas (completely clear sky) through to 8 oktas (completely overcast). In  addition, in the SYNOP code there is an extra cloud cover indicator '9' indicating that the sky is totally obscured (i.e. hidden from view), usually due to dense fog or heavy snow.

When used in weather charts, okta measurements are shown by means of graphic symbols (rather than numerals) contained within weather circles, to which are attached further symbols indicating other measured data such as wind speed and wind direction.

Although relatively straightforward to measure (visually, for instance, by using a mirror), oktas only estimate cloud cover in terms of the area of the sky covered by clouds. They do not account for cloud type or thickness, and this limits their use for estimating cloud albedo or surface solar radiation receipt.

Cloud oktas can also be measured using satellite imagery from geostationary satellites equipped with high-resolution image sensors such as Himawari-8. Similar to traditional approaches, satellite images do not account for cloud composition.

Oktas are often referenced in aviation weather forecasts and low level forecasts: SKC = Sky clear (0 oktas); FEW = Few (1 to 2 oktas); SCT = Scattered (3 to 4 oktas); BKN = Broken (5 to 7 oktas); OVC = Overcast (8 oktas); NSC = nil significant cloud; CAVOK = ceiling and visibility okay.

Hand-drawn maps 

In the early 20th century, it was common for weather maps to be hand drawn.  The symbols for cloud cover on these maps, like the modern symbols, were drawn inside the circle marking the position of the weather station making the measurements.  Unlike the modern symbols, these ones consisted of straigt lines only rather than filled in blocks which would have been less practical on a hand drawing.  A reduced set of these symbols were used on teleprinters used for distributing weather information and warnings.  These machines were 5-bit teleprintes using a modified version of the Baudot-Murray code.

Unicode 
There are some symbols in Unicode which resemble those used for oktas. However, some okta symbols lack a similar-looking Unicode character. The use of Unicode to render oktas depends on whether a font with these characters is installed; Unicode symbols may be difficult to work with in software that does not render these characters uniformly.

The Unicode set of related symbols includes:

References

Clouds
Units of meteorology measurement